Kalekay Nagra (Urdu: كاليکے ناگرہ), is a suburban village with a population of around 500 in the Tehsil Pasrur and District Sialkot of Punjab province of Pakistan. Administratively it is located in Union Council Adamkay Nagra. It is located at 32° 19' 12.6408 N 74° 29' 28.2804 E with an altitude of 238 metres (784 feet). The nearest big cities are Sialkot, Pasrur, Daska, Narowal and Gujranwala. Marala-Ravi Link Canal passes near it and used to cultivate its fertile land.

References

Villages in Sialkot District